Rum-Bar Rum is a white overproof rum produced in Jamaica and sold worldwide by Worthy Park Estate. Since its introduction in 2007, the Rum-Bar brand has been expanded to include Rum-Bar Rum Cream, a cream liqueur made with a blend of 100% real cream and Rum-Bar Rum; Rum-Bar Gold, a 4 year old premium gold rum; and a line of Rum-Bar vodkas, which includes classic and green apple varieties.

See also
 List of rum producers

References

Further reading
 "Grooving with Rum Bar Rum" Jamaica Gleaner News - Outlook - Sunday | February 7, 2010

External links

Jamaican brands
Jamaican rum
Rums